Great Conglomerate Falls is a  waterfall on the Black River in Michigan. It is split into two drops in the summertime when water is lower. The falls takes its name from the large conglomerate outcropping in the middle of the river that forms its segmented appearance.

Notes

Landforms of Gogebic County, Michigan
Waterfalls of Michigan